Polich is a surname. Notable people with the surname include:

John Polich (1915–2001), American ice hockey player
Mike Polich (born 1952), American ice hockey player

See also
Povich